The Battle of El Manzano, also known as the Battle of Pachacamac was a confrontation between Peruvian and Chilean forces that occurred on December 27, 1880 in the El Manzano hills on the south side of the Lurín River during the Lima campaign during the War of the Pacific.

Background

When the landing of Chilean troops led by Patricio Lynch in Pisco became known in Lima, Colonel Pedro José Sevilla was ordered with 250 cavalry soldiers to harass Lynch's march to the north, which did not yield the expected results. The Chilean brigade arrived without fighting at the point where the rest of the landed army was waiting in Lurín and Curayaco, leaving the troops from Sevilla in the rear. Sevilla, who knew about the new landing in Lurín, thought that this wouldn't have occupied the interior, so he continued his journey relatively close to the coast and without outposts observing the road. He also sent a notice to Lima announcing his return and the itinerary he hoped to follow.

The Battle
The courier with the news was taken prisoner and with this information, Orozimbo Barbosa, head of the second brigade of the second division, prepared a trap for Sevilla and his cavalry.

The unequal combat began on the night of December 27 and continued sporadically until dawn. On the next and subsequent day, a search and pursuit began for the horsemen who were able to escape.

The Capture
Emilio Sotomayor Baeza, head of the II Division, was informed about the capture of the commander of the Rimac regiment, Colonel Sevilla , 9 officers, 1 surgeon, 1 intern, 1 telegraph operator and 120 troops. Barbosa also reported the capture of 100 Remington carbines, spears, sabers and 120 horses, and as a complement, more than 1000 animals including cattle, sheep and goats. Among the war material was also the telegraph apparatus, the instruments of his music band, the regiment's documentation and important private and official communications.

The Chileans had 5 casualties: 1 dead (José Olano) and 4 wounded. Peruvian casualties are not known.

References

Bibliography
 
 
 
 Parte de Orozimbo Barbosa sobre el Manzano

Battles involving Chile
Battles involving Peru
Battles of the War of the Pacific
History of Lima Region
Conflicts in 1880
1880 in Peru
December 1880 events